Marvin Baumgartner Revelo (born January 13, 1994) is a Swiss-born Salvadoran footballer who currently plays for FC Bassersdorf in the 2. Liga Interregional.

Personal
Marvin Baumgartner Revelo was born in Switzerland to a Swiss father and Salvadoran mother.

Career
Baumgartner began his youth career in Switzerland playing for FC Kloten. After one successful season, he was scouted by one of the most important teams in Switzerland, FC Zurich. He joined the U13 squad where he went up the ranks (U14, U15, U16, U17, U18) until he reached the Reserve squad (FC Zurich II) where he played for 4 seasons. During the 2012 season Marvin participated in 4 friendly matches with the senior squad.

On February 2, 2015 Baumgartner signed his first professional contract with USL Side Real Monarchs Real Monarchs, making his first appearance on March 29, 2015 in a match against Portland Timbers 2.

International
Between 2008-2010 Baumgartner was a member on the Swiss U15, U16, and U17 National teams. He never played an official match with the youth squads, making him eligible to play for El Salvador. In 2012, he was discovered by Salvadoran scouting blog SelectaTalent. he caught the attention of the Salvadoran Football federation and was called in to a Pre-U20 WC qualifier camp. Head coach Mauricio Alfaro was impressed by his abilities on the pitch, and ability to adapt to a country where he didn't speak the language. He was named to the final roster and played every minute in the U-20 Qualifiers in Puebla, Mexico, where the team went on to qualify to the first U-20 World cup in the history of Salvadoran football.

In the summer of 2013, he was named to the U-20 world cup roster.  He played every minute of the World Cup group stage. In November 2014, he was named to the U-21 Roster to play the Juegos Centro Americanos y del Caribe that took place in Veracruz, Mexico. Once again Marvin played every minute for the National team.

References

1993 births
Living people
Swiss men's footballers
Swiss expatriate footballers
Swiss people of Salvadoran descent
Salvadoran footballers
Salvadoran expatriate footballers
Salvadoran expatriate sportspeople in Switzerland
FC Zürich players
Real Monarchs players
Association football defenders
Expatriate soccer players in the United States
Switzerland youth international footballers
USL Championship players
People from Bülach
Sportspeople from the canton of Zürich